The Passenger is a film written and directed by François Rotger. It was produced in France, Canada, and Japan; and has dialogue in French, Japanese and English.

It was nominated in the 2005 edition of the Locarno International Film Festival, the Tokyo International Film Festival, and Angers's Premiers Plans European Film Festival.

From his early work, 74km avec elle (8 min, France, 35mm color) and Jan (21 min, France, HDcam color) author/director François Rotger explores the themes of deception and betrayal within the family circle, often leading to sudden and extreme violence.

Synopsis 
Yakuza Naoki Sando (Yosuke Natsuki) discovers his daughter Hiroko (Kumi Kaneko) in bed with his adopted son Kohji (Yusuke Iseya). Three years later, Kohji is working the streets as a hustler, still yearning for a way to earn his estranged father's approval to continue his borderline incestuous relationship.
Hiroko sees a way back to her brother's arms when Sando's shady colleague Marc Tanner (François Trottier) absconds to Canada with gambling funds destined for the big boss. Presumably with her father's permission, she calls Kohji and tells him to hurry to Montréal, recover the money and kill Tanner.

External links

2005 films
2005 crime thriller films
2005 multilingual films
Yakuza films
French multilingual films
Canadian multilingual films
Japanese multilingual films
Canadian crime thriller films
Japanese crime thriller films
2000s Canadian films
2000s Japanese films
Canadian gangster films